Luther Hayes (March 7, 1939 – November 23, 2017) was an American football end. He played for the San Diego Chargers in 1961.

He died on November 23, 2017, in Palos Verdes, California at age 78.

References

1939 births
2017 deaths
American football ends
USC Trojans football players
San Diego Chargers players